Samuel N. Mumma Tobacco Warehouse is a historic tobacco warehouse located at East Hempfield Township, Lancaster County, Pennsylvania. It was built about 1914, and is a three-story, three bay by ten bay, rectangular brick building.  It has a gable roof and sits on a limestone foundation.  It was built for the processing and storage of cigar leaf tobacco.

It was listed on the National Register of Historic Places in 1997.

References

Industrial buildings and structures on the National Register of Historic Places in Pennsylvania
Industrial buildings completed in 1914
Buildings and structures in Lancaster County, Pennsylvania
Tobacco buildings in the United States
National Register of Historic Places in Lancaster County, Pennsylvania